Bath County Public Schools is a school division of Bath County, Virginia.

In 2022 Ricky N. Bolling became the superintendent.

Schools
 Bath County High School
 Millboro Elementary School
 Valley Elementary School

References

Further reading

External links
 Bath County Public Schools
School divisions in Virginia
Education in Bath County, Virginia